Neurologic Clinics is a medical journal that covers neurology-related topics, such as multiple sclerosis, epilepsy, stroke, headache, sleep disorders, pediatric-specific neurology etc. The journal is published by Elsevier.

Abstracting and indexing
The journal is abstracted and indexed in:
 Embase
 PubMed/Medline
 Current Contents - Clinical Medicine
 PsycINFO

According to the Journal Citation Reports, the journal has a 2021 impact factor of 3.787.

References

External links

Elsevier academic journals
English-language journals
Neurology journals
ISSN needed
Publications with year of establishment missing